The Foot Clan (also known simply as the Foot) is a fictional ninja clan in the Teenage Mutant Ninja Turtles comics and all related media and are the main antagonist faction. It is led by the devious Shredder and his second in command Karai. The Foot Clan was originally a parody of the criminal ninja clan The Hand in the Daredevil comics. In addition to the obvious similarity in their names, both clans originate from Feudal Japan, practice ninjutsu and black magic, and are now powerful global organized crime rings who are familiar with multiple illegal activities such as drug smuggling, counterfeiting of money, gunrunning, murder, assassination, computer hacking, theft, and terrorism.

Eastman and Laird's Teenage Mutant Ninja Turtles 
In the universe of Eastman and Laird's Teenage Mutant Ninja Turtles, the Foot Clan was founded in Feudal Japan by two men named Sato and Oshi. In Volume 1 Issue 47, the Turtles and Time Mistress Renet traveled to a time prior to the Foot's creation. There, Raphael met Sato and Oshi, and, not realising who they are, he taught them about Ninjutsu. After the Turtles returned to the present, Sato and Oshi decided to follow the ways of the ninja. Oshi declared: "We must never again mention the strange shelled creatures. In time, others will join us and we will become a force to be reckoned with. So just as every journey begins with a single step... we shall call ourselves The Foot."

The Foot Clan are the most feared clan of warriors and assassins in Japan. Both Hamato Yoshi and Oroku Nagi were members, until one day, Nagi attacked Yoshi's love Tang Shen and Yoshi killed Nagi. Dishonored, Yoshi and Shen fled to New York City, while Nagi's younger brother Oroku Saki was adopted by the clan and was trained to become a fierce ninja. When he was ready, Saki was sent to America to head the New York branch of the Clan. Under his leadership, it took only a year for it to become a powerful and fearsome group.

Saki also sought vengeance for his brother and, using the persona of "The Shredder", he assassinated Yoshi and Shen. Over a decade later, the Ninja Turtles challenged Shredder to a rooftop duel to avenge Yoshi and Shen. Shredder sent his Foot Ninja to fight the Turtles, but they were no match for the Turtles and were eventually defeated. Shredder then fought the Turtles himself, and although he was a more skilled ninja than them, he was killed when he fell off a building carrying a grenade. In the later issues, Shredder was revived to take revenge on the turtles and then revived again as a clone made of worms with mutating as a shark before perishing for good.

After Shredder's death, the American Foot fell apart, and the Foot Soldiers began fighting against Shredder's elite guard. Karai, a clan leader from Japan, came here to stop the clan war. She enlisted the Turtles' help in this, in exchange for promising that no Foot shall ever try to avenge the Shredder again. This peace treaty is still in effect in Volume 4 of the comic.

In Volume 4 the Foot were given a security contract by the Utroms for their base because the Utroms have a no weapons policy and the Foot are skilled at hand-to-hand combat. At some point, mysterious Aztec warriors started to attack the Foot all over the world. Karai informed Leonardo that the New York Branch of the Foot was all that was left.

The Foot Clan's logo is a drawing of a left foot. Issues 3 and 4 of the new Tales of the Teenage Mutant Ninja Turtles feature a Foot mystic with magical abilities, including the power to resurrect the dead.

1987 series and TMNT Adventures

The 1987 series and the spin-off TMNT Adventures comics share a similar continuity, and thus the same version of the Foot Clan. The Foot is an ancient ninjutsu clan, founded in Japan in 1583. The Shredder, followed by the Turtles and Splinter, went back and forth in time to try to kill the creator of the Foot Clan. In 1583, Shredder's ancestor Oroku Sancho led a small group of samurai, and Shredder offered to help him find magical artifacts that would give him power and wealth beyond his wildest dreams. Meanwhile, Splinter's ancestor Hamato Koji had been sent to find the same artifacts and did find them with the help of his descendant and the Turtles. One of the artifacts released a dragon, which headed for nearby villages; Splinter and Koji went to stop it while the Turtles went to fight Shredder. Sancho's men captured the Turtles and were about to execute them when Koji arrived, riding the dragon, which he had tamed. Seeing this, Sancho fled in fear, and Koji offered to lead Sancho's men and teach them the ninjutsu art of Shibana-Sama, founding the Foot Clan, so named for the footprint of the dragon in which he stood as he made his speech. (However, according to "Blast from the Past", the Foot was founded by the noble warrior Shibana-Sama).

In 1960s Japan, both Oroku Saki and Hamato Yoshi were part of the Clan. Saki framed Yoshi for trying to murder a visiting sensei and had him exiled to New York City, thus clearing the way to take over the Foot Clan. He then proceeded to turn the Foot Clan into an army of criminals. Over the years, Saki, who became known as The Shredder, moved to the US, allied himself with the alien warlord Krang, and replaced the human Foot Ninja with robotic Foot Soldiers. However, these robots are no match for the Ninja Turtles, who destroy them at every encounter.

In the cartoon, The Shredder once considered making more intelligent Foot Soldiers, capable of learning and taking decisions by themselves. However, the idea was quickly abandoned when the first intelligent prototype, named Alpha 1, rebelled against The Shredder.

The Foot Clan's logo is a drawing of a right foot, and the Foot Soldiers wear purple and black uniforms featuring the logo on their foreheads. The Foot logo can also be seen on the Technodrome.

The Archie TMNT Adventures comics features more advanced Foot Soldiers in addition to the basic model. In the comics, The Shredder also built a giant Foot Soldier, who fought against the Warrior Dragon in New York City. The robot was destroyed when it crashed into the Statue of Liberty.

The Foot robot concept allowed the Turtles to destroy the Foot soldiers without any moral thoughts, allowing Leonardo and Raphael to use their weapons more offensively. Meanwhile, the series could keep its younger audience and remain a "family show". This principle also benefited the video games.

IDW Publishing
In the IDW Publishing adaption, the Foot Clan existed since the time of feudal Japan where it was founded by a ronin by the name of Takeshi Tatsuo who had been betrayed by his master. The sorceress Kitsune helped Tatsuo, to recover from the severe wounds he had suffered in the assassination attempt. The name of the clan was created by the bloody footprint of Tatsuo whose leg was completely healed by Kitsune ministrations.

When Tatsuo was betrayed by his clan are learning that he made a pact with a magician, his mind was born again in the son of his murderer Oroku Saki, the uprooting of the reawakening of his old memories powered over the communities and with Kitsune's counsel the Foot was revived in modern times.

In more recent times, the clan under the leadership of Oroku Saki (who was now operating as Shredder) tried to expand its supremacy in New York City. Its Foot Ninja were therefore often sent to amass any science that could help the Foot and also to find new test subjects. In this way, it led to the creation of the mutant arctic fox Alopex.

In this endeavor, the Foot Clan also came into contact with the extradimensional warlord General Krang who also wanted to create a mutant army to meet his objectives. An attack by the Foot Clan in the laboratory of Krang's ally Baxter Stockman led by a combination of circumstances to the creation of the Turtles and their father Splinter (who in a previous life had himself belonged to the Foot Clan).

Besides Shredder, Kitsune, and a substantial number of Foot Ninjas, other members of the Foot Clan include Karai (who was a descendant of Oroku Saki and the daughter of Oroku Yori), Masato, Dr. Miller, Alopex (a mutated Arctic Fox), Rocksteady, Bebop, Koya (Shredder's pet brown falcon who was later mutated), and Bludgeon (a mutant hammerhead shark).

IDW also did a crossover issues with Batman called Batman/Teenage Mutant Ninja Turtles where the Foot Clan appeared. The first crossover showed the Foot Clan collaborating with the League of Assassins.

At the time when Mutant Town was established following a mutagen bomb going off the day when Baxter Stockman became the Mayor of New York City, Old Hob was meeting with Oroku Karai to sell her some mutants in order to strengthen the Foot Clan. She was able to purchase Tokka and Rahzar. A possible future in issue #113 depicts an event in 2032 where the Foot Clan goes to war with the Splinter Clan.

Movies

1990–2007
In the first and second movies, the Foot Clan is a group of ninja thieves founded by the Shredder in Japan, but later stationed in New York. The Shredder had taken what Foot Soldiers he had from Japan, and began taking kids from the streets upon moving to New York and training them in Ninjutsu himself. His second-in-command is another Ninjutsu master called Tatsu. In the films, the Foot use the kanji , which translates to "demon" or "ogre", as their symbol, worn in their hachimaki or on their backs. The Foot Ninja were no match for the Turtles individually, however their first major confrontation with the Turtles resulted in Raphael beaten nearly to death due to being overwhelmingly outnumbered and the remaining Turtles forced to retreat; all confrontations after showed the Turtles being able to defeat the Foot easily. After the Shredder's apparent death and massive arrests by the NYPD, the clan was reduced to a fraction of its former size by the second film.

In the second film, Tatsu tried to take command. He relinquished his claim when the Shredder returned. The clan then kidnapped Professor Jordon Perry of TGRI and forced him to use a mutagen so the Foot Clan could create two mutant warriors to fight the turtles. This results in a common snapping turtle and a gray wolf taken from the zoo being mutated into Tokka and Rahzar. Although these two mutants were a match for the Turtles in physical strength, the Turtles defeated them by de-mutating them back into normal harmless animals during a Vanilla Ice concert. Shredder then ingested the mutagen and became Super-Shredder. The Shredder himself apparently died shortly after the docks collapsed, while fighting the Turtles.

In the fourth film, the Foot is now under leadership of Karai, who has taken control after the Shredder's demise. They have grown in numbers and skill, and offer their services as mercenaries in the film. They are hired by Max Winters to track down and bring in the 13 monsters arriving in New York City. Eventually, they later learn of his intention to send the monsters back to their world with a portal, and that his stone generals have betrayed him by substituting Leonardo for the thirteenth monster in order to use the portal to bring in a new army of monsters to take over the Earth. It was then the Stone Generals demand that Karai and the Foot Clan serve them, but they refused, as they want to honor their deal with Winters. Without hesitation, Karai orders the Foot Clan to help April and Casey find the last monster and lure it into the portal while the Turtles fights the Generals as well as Winters and Splinter warding off new more coming from the portal. After the final monster is sent in to the portal along with the Stone Generals, Karai and the Foot Clan peacefully part ways with the Turtles, reminding them of the Shredder's possible return.

2014 film
In the 2014 live-action film (which is a reboot of the Teenage Mutant Ninja Turtles film series), the Foot Clan are no longer considered an international ninja cult, but rather a modern American terrorist organization. Besides Shredder and Karai, the film also introduced Eric Sacks who is Shredder's student, Dr. O'Neil's former lab partner, and the CEO of Sacks Industries. Instead of black unitard-clad masked ninjitsu warriors, they are portrayed as fully armed men that wear black military-like uniforms and often wore kabuki style masks to conceal one's identity.

In Teenage Mutant Ninja Turtles: Out of the Shadows, the Foot Ninjas make their appearance, under leadership of Baxter Stockman to free Shredder. After Krang met with Shredder and told him about the device that would bring the Technodrome to Earth, Shredder and Karai recruited escaped prisoners Rocksteady and Bebop to aid them in obtaining the pieces.

Ninja Turtles: The Next Mutation
In the 1997-1998 Ninja Turtles: The Next Mutation series, the Foot Clan is a street gang, similar to the movies. After Venus defeated The Shredder, Leonardo told the kids that the Foot is a lie, and the clan was disbanded.

2003 series

In the 2003 series, the Foot Clan is more similar to its original comic version. The Foot Clan are a group of warriors and assassins that Shredder created 700 years ago in Japan. The Shredder, who in this series is a long-lived Utrom named Ch'rell, has led the Clan since its creation and has turned it into a fearsome and secret group present across the world. The Foot emblem is a red, trident-like dragon's footprint (hence the name of the clan), an inverted version of the "Three-Toed Sign of the Dragon", the symbol of the five warriors who had defeated the original demon known as the Shredder in 300 AD. Thanks to Shredder's knowledge of Utrom technology, the Clan has weapons and equipment centuries ahead of human technology. They once created Foot Mechs in Rogue in the House which were based on Master Splinter, the President, the Prime Minister, and some others.

The Foot Clan is divided into several branches:

 The most commonly encountered, and seemingly most numerous, branch are the Foot Ninja, the basic warriors of the Foot. They're generally depicted as easily beaten except in very large groups. When Karai started working in New York, they received extra training from her and became much harder for the Turtles to defeat.
 The seemingly most-skilled of the clan warriors are the four Elite Foot Ninja. These Foot Clan members serve as the Shredder's elite guard, as well as field commanders on highly important missions. Each carries a different weapon: a trident, a spear, an axe, and a twin bladed sword (aside from their different weapons there's no way to tell them apart). They've all proven extremely deadly fighters, having easily defeated and nearly killed Leonardo when they first appeared. When the other Turtles met them, they complimented the Elites on their very round head attire (similar to a coolie hat), with Michelangelo, Donatello and Raphael going so far as saying "Nice hats!"
 The Foot Tech Ninja are warriors with specialized stealth armor that allows them to become seemingly invisible. They also possess greatly enhanced physical speed and strength, but their invisibility is what always gives the Turtles and their allies trouble.
 The various video games introduced the Foot Gunners and the sumo-wrestling Mega Foots, although only the Foot Gunners then went on to appear in the TV series as Foot Mechs.
 The Foot Clan Technicians have cybernetic enhancements but are rarely ever seen in fights.
 The powerful but seldom seen Foot Mystics are five magic-users, each one with powers corresponding to a different natural element: wind, earth, fire, water and metal. In the episode "Bad Day", it is revealed that the Foot Mystics have Black Magic powers, when they launch an attack against the Turtles on an astral plane. It is also revealed that they obey and serve whoever holds a medallion called the Heart of Tengu. It is also said the Shredder had more respect for their power than Karai, but she repeatedly tells them that as long as she had the medallion, they will obey her with no questions asked. This later leads them to trick Agent Bishop and Baxter Stockman into destroying the Heart, in the episode "Good Genes, Part 2", allowing them to become free. They then set out to restore the true Shredder. When freed the Mystics were able to revert to their true forms and were shown to be far more powerful than previously shown. Despite their fanatical devotion to the demon Shredder, they were still abused by him for so much as saying anything he felt was out of line. They are eventually killed in "Enter the Dragons, Part 1", although in the Fast Forward episode "The Journal" a Foot Mystic appeared before Raphael and Casey Jones and teleported them to a deserted island in one of the pages of Casey and April's journal that the Turtles were reading despite Splinter and Cody's warnings not to read it. However, this particular event was a complete fabrication by Master Splinter and Cody in order to teach the Turtles a lesson.
 The Cyber Foot are Foot Soldiers that work for Cyber-Shredder and Master Khan. Their outfits are similar to the Cyber-Shredder's armor.

Towards the end of the Ninja Turtles magazine published at the same time as the series, the Foot Mystics are killed by Splinter, when he uses the Sword of Tengu on them. He causes the Fire Mystic to melt the Metal Mystic, the Water Mystic to quench the Fire Mystic, the Earth Mystic to swallow the Water Mystic, the Wind Mystic to scatter the Earth Mystic, and the Metal Mystic is killed by Splinter. However, he is drained by the Sword's power (having not used Leonardo's magic glove).

The Foot Clan itself is under the ultimate command of The Utrom Shredder Ch'rell, and his second in command is his adopted daughter Karai. Prior to Karai's appearance, Hun served as Shredder's second and chief enforcer as well as leading the Purple Dragons. But when Karai appeared, she was quickly shown to be higher in Shredder's favor than Hun. After The Shredder was exiled to the ice asteroid belt of Mor Tal in the episode "Exodus, Part 2", Karai assumed command of the Clan and the mantle of the Shredder giving the Foot Ninja and Foot Elite new designs while Hun evolved the Purple Dragons from a street gang to an organized criminal organization.

Somehow after the events of the defeat of the Demon Shredder and the year the Turtles were stuck in the future in Fast Forward, Khan gained control of the Foot, who now dressed in Cyber Foot armor. Under Khan's rule, they were in a gang war against Hun and the Purple Dragons. Once Cyber Shredder appeared, he took control and it was Khan's mission to bring him back into reality. Many believe Khan was once an Elite Foot since his theme is the same theme used whenever the Elite Foot appeared.

Khan must have lost control of the Foot after Cyber Shredder's defeat because Karai was in control of the Foot once more in the movie Turtles Forever. At this point, the Utrom Shredder returned by means of his counterpart, the Shredder of the 1987 series. The Technodrome became the headquarters for the Foot Clan of the 2003 series and the robotic foot soldiers were added to the Foot's fighting force after an upgrade with Utrom technology. Using Krang's mutagen reverse-engineered from the mutagen that affected Hun, they also added mutated some of the Cyber Foot where they were classified as Mutant Foot Soldiers and were not seen coming in contact with whatever they mutated into. While two of these mutants resemble Tokka and Rahzar, the rest of the Mutant Foot Soldiers consist of a sea creature-like mutant, a one-eyed mutant, a tiger-like mutant, a mutant with an octopus-shaped head, an insect-like mutant, a bat-like mutant, and some unspecified mutants. The Utrom Shredder kept the 1987 Shredder and Krang on, as well as Bebop and Rocksteady to help lead the Foot. However the Utrom Shredder turned on his counterpart and Krang later in the movie. The Utrom Shredder was eventually destroyed by the Technodrome's weapons. Karai most likely retook control of the Foot at this point.

2012 series
In the 2012 series, the Foot Clan's origins are expanded on in the second season of the series. The clan was founded in Japan by a master martial artist named Koga Takuza, who used the swords of his fallen foes to forge a helmet stronger than steel, dubbing it the Kuro Kabuto. The Kabuto helmet is a symbol of the leader of the Foot Clan, passed down to the various rulers in the Foot's history. The Foot Clan would end up in a lengthy war against the Hamato Clan, which reached a boiling point when Oroku Saki was raised alongside Hamato Yoshi. Though the two were raised as brothers, Saki discovered his true heritage as being an orphaned Foot Clan member, and when his love Tang Shen wed Yoshi, he inadvertently killed Shen leaving Yoshi to perish while saving his infant daughter Hamato Miwa. Saki rose in the ranks to become the leader of the Foot Clan, tutoring several worthy pupils such as world-famous martial arts star Chris Bradford (who would later be mutated into Dogpound and later Rahzar) and Brazilian street thug Xever Montes (who would later be mutated into Fishface) and sharing business with business partners such as Russian arms dealer Ivan Steranko, Chinese-American Purple Dragons leader Hun, and Italian mafia boss Don Vizioso. In this series, the Foot Clan is a global ninjutsu clan answering only to the Shredder, though others run the various factions of the Foot Clan across the globe.

Shredder commanded the Foot from Japan until he learned that Yoshi was training his own ninjas in New York City, and moved his inner clan there with the objective of finding and killing Yoshi and his students. However, Shredder, Karai (a renamed Miwa), Dogpound, Fishface, and their reluctant new conscript, former TCRI inventor Baxter Stockman, fail time and again to do so. Karai learned of the Kraang, an alien race responsible for the mutations of Splinter and the Turtles, who are secretly plotting to conquer and terraform Earth, but Shredder dismisses them until he captures one himself and learns from it that the Turtles guard April O'Neil, whose half-Kraang genetics were needed for their invasion. After another failed attempt to kill the Turtles, Shredder allies the Foot Clan with the Kraang, as they share a mutual enemy in the Hamato Clan.

In the second season, Shredder left the New York clan under Karai's command, citing urgent business to attend to in Japan. Karai, having been lied to by Shredder to believe that Splinter killed Tang Shen (believing herself to be Saki and Shen's child), uses her new position to aggressively hunt the Hamato Clan until her father's return. Shredder reshuffles the Foot Clan's hierarchy upon his return, installing mutated Japanese mercenary Tiger Claw as his new second-in-command and stripping Karai of the position, though Tiger Claw was briefly trapped in various other dimensions before eventually returning to the fold. Baxter Stockman was later mutated into Stockman-Fly upon his mutagen collar being set off by Shredder for his 74th attempt at making a mutant army for him. However, having been told of her true nature by Splinter and the Turtles, Karai betrayed her father, and when she was brought before him, he admitted that she was Splinter and Tang Shen's biological daughter and imprisons her. The Foot Clan would on one notable occasion be fully mobilized when the Kabuto was stolen by professional thief Anton Zeck on behalf of Steranko. Karai was soon used in a hasty plan to gain vengeance on Splinter by Shredder, resulting in her mutation into a snake-like mutant (though she went back and forth to an additional chemical that Stockman-Fly accidentally added), further strengthening the violent split between the Foot Clan and the Hamato Clan.

As a result, Shredder opted to aid the Kraang in their invasion of New York and the Earth, dismissing the likelihood that the Kraang will turn on him. In exchange for their aid in taking New York, Kraang Prime promised to cure Karai of her mutation. The invasion was successful, and though Leonardo defeated the majority of his men in battle, Shredder critically wounded him and was able to finally defeat Splinter, having lost to him on several prior occasions.

In the third season, Shredder reveals that they will betray the Kraang and has the entire clan search for Karai before learning that Splinter had survived but lost his memory. It was returned to him by April when she, the Turtles and Casey Jones came to rescue him and she used her physic Kraang powers to bring Splinter to his senses. Shredder later mutated Anton Zeck into Bebop and Ivan Steranko into Rocksteady for Anton's theft of the Kuro Kabuto and Ivan's hunting of Karai. When the two of them tried to attack Shredder in retaliation, Shredder beat them up and told them to either serve him or fall at hand. Ivan and Anton agreed to Shredder's terms—for now. Following a fight with the Turtles, Rocksteady and Bebop successfully captured Serpent Karai and brought her to the Shredder. After the Kraang were defeated and driven back to their home dimension by the Turtles and the Mighty Mutanimals, the balance of power over the Manhattan underworld is shifted over to the Foot Clan. This was done for Shredder by gaining control over the Purple Dragon and other Asian gangs through Hun (and possibly Tiger Claw), several South American gangs through Fishface, the Russian Mafia through Rocksteady, and the Italian Mafia through Don Vizioso. By using this power, Shredder had these crime groups aid him with collecting various chemicals from a chemical company called Aumen, an abandoned Kraang lab and Vizioso for a mind control serum that he planned to create and use on the Turtles, the Mutanimals and Karai. The Foot were also served on at least two occasions by a trio of mutants created from the Shredder's DNA and that of several crustaceans, but these were later destroyed after being fused into the so-called "Mega Shredder." The Foot later formed an unlikely alliance with Splinter and the Turtles to deal with the threat of the Triceraton's Black Hole Generator, only for Shredder to violate the truce and murder Splinter before he could deactivate the device. As a result, the device went off, and all the Foot Clan members were drawn into the black hole along with the entirety of Earth's population-with the exception of April, Casey, and the Turtles-and the planet itself.

Due to the Fugitoid using a device on his ship at the start of the fourth season, time was reset to six months before the Triceraton invasion so that the Turtles, April, and Casey could prevent the Triceratons from assembling the  Black Hole Generator. The heroes later teamed with their past selves to save the Earth, during which they were able to alert Splinter to Shredder's murderous intent, leading to a duel between Splinter and Shredder. Splinter achieved victory, but Tiger Claw recovered his master and warned that the Foot Clan would return.

Karai started to lead a splintered branch of the Foot Clan with the witch Shinigami which goes into battle against Shredder's branch. Shredder recuperates by taking mutagen which transforms him into Super-Shredder in order to turn the tide against Kara's branch. Super-Shredder managed to kill Splinter. When most of its members are defeated, Super-Shredder is hit by some retro-mutagen which failed to work and is beheaded by Leonardo.

In the final season, Tiger Claw started to lead the Foot Clan and their new Foot Cultists into summoning the mystical dragonoid Kavaxas from the Netherworld with a special talisman. After gathering Shredder's helmet and heart from Tatsu's branch and Don Vizioso's group, Tiger Claw had Kavaxas revive Shredder as a sentient zombie. Zombie Shredder started to take Kavaxas as his second-in-command. During the fight against the Foot Clan, Fishface left after explaining the Foot Cultists' origin to the Turtles, a revived Rahzar fell into the Netherworld, and Kavaxas was forcefully dragged back into the Netherworld by Zombie Shredder who states that they belong dead. Afterwards, Tiger Claw calls a truce with the Turtles.

The Foot Clan also has a variation in their soldiers:

 In the early episodes, the human Foot Ninjas are used. The Foot Soldiers wear black suits and masks. The masks appear to have bug-like eyes and have the Foot Clan logo on it (similar to the outfits worn by the Foot Ninjas from the 1990s films). The Foot Ninjas seem to never talk. Each of the Foot Ninjas fight with staffs, shurikens, katanas, Naginata, Tonfa, and nunchaku. The Foot Ninja recruits are trained at Chris Bradford's dojos.
 In Season Two, the Foot Clan gains Foot-Bots that resemble the Foot Ninjas, but are robotic and were created by the Kraang to strengthen the Foot Clan. The Foot-Bots can adapt to every ninja moves and skills. During the Turtles' fight with the Foot Bots, the Turtles had to do unpredictable moves and skills to defeat them. The Foot-Bots later got upgraded with two extra retractable arms with weapons protruding from where the hands would be and with retractable fabric wings that give them gliding abilities. For some unknown reason during that time, the Foot-Bots appeared more than the normal Foot Ninjas.

2018 series
In Rise of the Teenage Mutant Ninja Turtles, the Foot Clan were initially peaceful and lived in the feudal Japan, but came under attack and were nearly wiped out, their leader Oroku Saki sought help from an Oni who provided him with a mystic armor that allowed him to defeat their attackers, but the armor corrupted Saki and turned him to the Shredder who led the Foot down to an evil path. Its known members in the present are the Foot Lieutenant and the Foot Brute. They can make origami ninjas out of paper and have the power of teleportation through hidden gateways. They seek to revive their master and are collecting the pieces of his armor in the shape of ancient artifacts.

In the episode "The Evil League of Mutants," the Foot Lieutenant and an origami ninja were shown committing a heist which the Turtles couldn't stop. Later on, the Foot Lieutenant and the Foot Brute teleported Baron Draxum away from the Turtles as both sides see that they have a common enemy in them.

The episode "Shadow of Evil" revealed that the Foot uses a shoe store called the Foot Shack as a front for their activities.

In "Warren and Hypno, Sitting in a Tree," Draxum claimed the gauntlet Warren Stone had that turned out to be part of the Kuroi Yōroi for the Foot.

In "Operation: Normal," the Foot Brute and the Foot Recruit targeted the slime Yōkai, Sunita because the boots she was wearing were part of the Kuroi Yōroi. They managed to claim them.

In "How to Make Enemies and Bend People to Your Will," Draxum and the Foot Recruit found out that a Kuroi Yōroi fragment was at the botanical gardens. They claimed it after setting up events where the Foot Lieutenant and the Foot Brute would fail. After obtaining the fragment, Draxum declared himself the Foot's leader, via exploiting a loophole in the clan's rulings of leadership.

In "One Man's Junk," the next piece of the Kuroi Yōroi was in the possession of Repo Mantis who claimed it from a Yōkai and held in his salvage yard. After trapping the cat/mantis mutant who was owned by Repo Mantis, the Turtles learn from him that two fire-headed guys working as shoe salesmen bought the metal from him. This caused the Turtles to learn that the Foot Lieutenant and the Foot Brute claimed the metal.

In "End Game," Draxum donned the restored Kuroi Yōroi with the intention of destroying humanity once and for all. The Foot Lieutenant and Foot Brute addressed him as Shredder, but he rejected the title, confused with the name "Shredder". Due to a Jupiter Jim action figure being wedged in a hole in the back of the helmet, the Turtles and April managed to attack that part and caused the armor to fall off of Draxum, though the armor revived itself after siphoning some of Draxum's life force. It is later explained by the Foot Lieutenant that the clan was just manipulating Draxum into donning the Kuroi Yōroi so it could drain his life force to reassemble and resurrect the Shredder.

In "Many Happy Returns," Shredder acted like a feral beast, likely due to the damage the armor received when it was worn by Draxum. After being attacked by the demon, the Foot Lieutenant, Foot Brute, and Foot Recruit retreat to find out what went wrong.

In "Battle Nexus: New York," the Foot Recruit discovered that Big Mama has been controlling Shredder with a control device and it's associated magic ring. When Big Mama is disarmed of the ring, the Foot Recruit claims it and uses the Shredder to make Big Mama lose everything. As the Shredder destroys the Grand Nexus Hotel, the Foot Recruit can be heard shouting "Foot Clan" as she flies off on Shredder's back.

In the four part "Finale" episode, When the Turtles and Splinter head to the Twilight Realm to get a weapon that would beat the Shredder, who was actually his daughter Karai and was preventing him from reaching full strength. After regaining his power and mind, Shredder leads the Foot Clan into attacking the Turtles. They managed to beat the Turtles and make off with Splinter and Baron Draxum. Using Baron Draxum's laboratory in the Hidden City, Shredder gets the information he needs. A brief fight between Shredder and Baron Draxum collapses part of the laboratory. The cave-in traps the Foot Lieutenant and the Foot Brute as Shredder tells the Foot Recruit to leave them while making her his general. Thanks to information from a recuperating Big Mama, the Turtles and April were able to head to the Crying Titan where Shredder is planning to harness the Empyrean so that he can extract Splinter's essence. With help from a defecting Foot Recruit, the Turtles and April free Splinter and Baron Draxum. The group combines their strengths with the spirits of Splinter's ancestors to defeat the Shredder while reuniting Oroku Saki's spirit with the Hamato Clan's spirits.

In the film, Foot Lieutenant gathers the Foot Clan to find a mystic weapon called the key and use it to bring the Krang back, after doing so, the Krang mutate them into complete subservient.

Batman vs. Teenage Mutant Ninja Turtles
The Foot Clan appear in the film Batman vs. Teenage Mutant Ninja Turtles (which is based on the IDW crossover). Sato and Oshi (see above) are mentioned as founders of the Foot Clan. The Foot Clan collaborated with the League of Assassins in a plot that involved using a stolen Wayne Enterprises cloud seeder to spread a compound containing a mixture of mutagen and Joker venom on Gotham City. A select number of Foot Ninjas were mutated into mutant animals where two of them were mutated into a mutant pigeon and a mutant Tyrannosaurus.

Video games
 Unlike the 1987 cartoon series on which they were based, the TMNT videogames introduced Foot Soldiers with uniforms of several different colors. These colors represent the type of weapons they are carrying.
 Teenage Mutant Ninja Turtles: The Manhattan Missions uses Foot Soldiers from the Mirage Comics though they dress in black like in the films.
 Video games, based on the 2003 animated series, have Foot Soldiers which appear as they do in the new series.
 The fighting games TMNT: Mutant Melee and TMNT: Smash Up have Foot Ninja as playable characters.
 In Teenage Mutant Ninja Turtles: Shredder's Revenge, the Foot Clan is steadily rebuilt by Shredder after their alleged destruction in Turtles in Time. They are placed under the control of various members of the Shredder Elite, though due to Shredder not giving away information about the fact the other members are supposed work together, they become embroiled in a gang war. Their presence is unknown after the events of the game.

Members
 Shredder - The leader of the Foot Clan and the arch-villain of the Ninja Turtles in most versions his real name is Oroku Saki a villainous ninjitsu master and often have a personal connection to Hamato Yoshi and Splinter in the Turtles origins and their most recurring foe in the franchise.
 Karai - A female high-ranking member of the Foot originally someone on equal level of authority with Shredder in later versions she would become his right-hand and often his relative who usually has a rivalry with Leonardo.
 Bebop and Rocksteady - A mutant warthog and rhinoceros who usually serve the Shredder.
 Tokka and Rahzar - A mutant snapping turtle and wolf who are usually employed to the Shredder in most versions.
 Baxter Stockman - A mad scientist who sometimes works for the Shredder in some versions.
 Tatsu - Shredder's right-hand man in the live action movies.
 Purple Dragons - A street gang led by Hun who are affiliated with the Foot in a few versions.
 Hun - The leader of the Purple Dragons who sometimes works for the Shredder in some versions and is the arch-enemy of Casey Jones.
 Hamato Yoshi - He was a former member of the Foot Clan in most versions.
 Shredder Clones - Clones of the Shredder whose origins vary in different media appearances.
 Claw Shredder - A clone of Shredder with monstrous crustacean-like claws.
 Mini Shredder - A miniature clone of Shredder.
 Shiva Shredder - A towering four-armed clone of Shredder.
 Foot Ninja - The Foot Ninja serves as the basic soldiers for the Foot.
 Foot Elite - The elite Foot Ninjas trained by the Shredder.
 Foot Mystics - The Foot Mystics first appeared in the 2003 series. Another version of them appeared in the comics.
 Foot Bots - Foot Bots are robotic soldiers for the Foot.

Mirage members
 Cha Ocho - A member of the Foot Clan.
 Hiroshi - A Foot med-tech.
 Izumi - 
 Lin - A female member of the Foot Clan.
 Mamoru - A Foot Mystic.
 Mashima - A Foot Mystic.
 Oroku Nagi - The older brother of Shredder.
 Oshi - 
 Pimiko - The daughter of Shredder.
 Sato - 
 Sid Jones - The cousin of Casey Jones.
 Tomai - 
 Yanada -
 The Mistress - Tang Shen's sister and Shredder's former concubine.

1990s film members
 Danny Pennington - Charles Pennington's teenage son who joined the Foot Clan. He later defected to the Turtles' side during the final battle.
 Freddy - A Foot Clan member in the second movie who poses as April O'Neil's camera operator.

2003 members
 Khan (voiced by Sean Schemmel) - A Foot Clan member that worked for Cyber-Shredder.
 Dr. Chaplin (voiced by Zachary Mastoon) - A young scientist who worked for the Foot Clan and was a fan of Baxter Stockman. He develops a crush on Karai. After the conclusion of the Ninja Tribunal story arc, they start a relationship with each other.
 Yin and Yang - Karai's female attendants.

IDW members
 Bludgeon - A mutant hammerhead shark.
 Kitsune - A member of the Pantheon and the youngest of the group who assisted Shredder in the founding the Foot Clan. She seeks to revive her father and untie the pantheon which would wipe out humanity in the process and wanted Shredder to be his host. Despite this, Kitsune and Shredder were lovers and sincerely felt affection towards one another.
 Jennika - A young Foot assassin who is later turned into a mutant turtle and joins the Turtles as their fifth member.
 Toshiro - An elderly mentor of the Foot Clan who is often consulted by Karai for his wisdom and serenity.
 Koya - A female mutant brown falcon that was mutated from Shredder's pet brown falcon.
 Masato - A former leader of the Foot Clan and the sensei of Hamato Yoshi.
 Natsu - Natsu is young woman who was a part of the Yakuza, but now serves Karai.
 Ocho - Ocho is a Yokai mole transformed by Kitsune who was guarding a sword until Karai retrieves it and thus becoming her servant.
 Oroku Maji - The father of Oroku Saki.
 Patrick Miller - A professor and expert on the Foot Clan. He was later killed by a Foot assassin sent by Karai.
 Sarsparilla - A mutant armadillo seen in the possible future of 2032 during the Foot Clan's war with the Splinter Clan.
 Takeshi Tatsuo - The founder of the Foot Clan and past life of the Shredder.
 Tetsu Oni - An alias of Krang.

2012 series members
 Koga Takuzu - The founder of the Foot Clan who forged the Kuro Kabuto helmet made from the armor pieces that he claimed from his defeated opponents.
 Oroku Keiji - The father of Oroku Saki. He was killed by Hamato Yuta.
 Chris Bradford - An American celebrity martial arts master and action star. Unknown to the broad public, he is one of Shredder's disciples. Chris is mutated twice in the series: in the first instance, Chris was mutated into a mutant akita named Dogpound as a result of Chris being bitten by Shredder's pet akita Hachinko; in the second instance, he was mutated into Rahzar. He was also the producer and star of the TV cartoon series Chris Bradford's 2 Ruff Krew.
 Xever Montes - An Afro-Brazilian street urchin who was freed from prison by Shredder after being caught stealing and got recruited into the Foot Clan. He is often partnered with Bradford, despite the two of them never getting along. He later gets mutated into a mutant snakehead, after touching one while visiting a fish shop in search of the Turtles. Initially unable to walk and capable of breathing only underwater, he was soon provided with a pair of mechanic legs, as well as a breathing device built by Baxter Stockman.
 Shinigami (voiced by Gwendoline Yeo) - A young witch who is allied with Karai's branch of the Foot Clan.
 Tiger Claw (voiced by Eric Bauza) - As a boy, Takeshi was mutated into a mutant Bengal tiger after stumbling into one of the Kraang's portals. He later became an assassin hired by Shredder to aid him in his affairs.

2014 film members
 Eric Sacks (portrayed by William Fichtner) - The CEO of Sacks Industries who was adopted at a young age by Shredder.

2018 series members
 Foot Lieutenant (voiced by Rob Paulsen) - A tall and thin member of the Foot Clan serves as the Foot Clan's lieutenant.
 Foot Brute (voiced by Maurice LaMarche) - A super-strong member of the Foot Clan who is partnered with the Foot Lieutenant.
 Origami Ninjas - The Foot Ninja made of paper.
 Foot Recruit (voiced by Zelda Williams) - Cassandra "Casey" Jones is a member of the Foot Clan with a hyper-aggressive personality. She debuted in "Hot Soup: The Game" where she was helping the Foot Lieutenant and the Foot Brute look for an artifact. Foot Recruit's real name was revealed when she later defects to the Turtles' side during the final battle against Shredder.
 Jocelyn (voiced by Cree Summer) - A Foot Initiate who gains the mark of the Foot Initiate in "How to Make Enemies and Bend People to Your Will." The Foot Recruit claimed to Baron Draxum that she got the mark because her parents are "big donors."

Analysis
Peter Vogl, referring to the movie from 1990, found the teenage members of the Foot Clan a remarkably dark representation of the youths of New York, who are so depraved and without moral compass that they prefer to follow a Japanese gangster boss rather than the generation of their parents. He found that this culture-pessimistic vision seems implausible only at first glance, considering actual cases of youths from Western countries following the Islamic State. He also pointed out that the root of the challenge depicted in Teenage Mutant Ninja Turtles is not domestic, but Shredder and his assistants come from abroad. Vogl concludes that, even if not intended by the creators, the movie employs fears of city crime, of the young generation, and of foreignness.

References

External links

Fictional robots
Japan in fiction
Teenage Mutant Ninja Turtles characters
Fictional kidnappers
Fictional Ninjutsu practitioners
Fictional terrorist organizations
Fictional organizations in comics
Comics characters introduced in 1984
Comic book terrorist organizations
Japan in non-Japanese culture